Carlos & Alejandra is an is an American music duo that focuses on the genre of bachata. The duo is composed of members Carlos Vargas Franco Jr. and Bianca Alejandra Feliz. Their first album was La Introduccion. The album was nominated for Tropical Album of the Year in the Awards Ceremony Premios Lo Nuestro 2010.

Despite the success of the duo, they split in 2016, with each following their own separate paths as solo artists.

Biography

Carlos Vargas
Now known as solo act Circharles
Carlos Vargas Franco Jr. was raised in The Bronx, New York. He paired with Alejandra by music label Romance Records. He is of Dominican descent and born on August 27, 1984. Carlos was offered work in the bachata group Aventura, but he rejected the offer.

After the breakup, Carlos continued a solo career under the stage name Circharles. Under that name he released his solo album Alter Ego in 2017 with singles like "Empeñaria mi vida" and"Si Me Dejas". Later on he released singles like "Besos Toxicos" and "Tu Judini".

Alejandra Feliz
Born Bianca Alejandra Feliz on January 4, 1987, to a Dominican father and a Puerto Rican mother. She studied in Boston Arts Academy, and in Boston's Suffolk University graduating in Penal Law.

She worked in music, fashion and modelling and in 2004 won a beauty pageant contest crowned Miss Anacaona. She also took part in TV show Action Lights, Camera presenting a segment on fashion and show business. After one and a half years, she decided to consecrate fully to music. She met Carlos Vargas through mutual interest in bachata.

After break-up she continues her solo career. She released her solo album Ahora Es Que Falta in 2019.

Discography

Albums
As A Duo
Destiny (2007)
La Introduccion (2009)

Solo Albums
Circharles
Alter Ego (2017)

EPs
El Baul (2018)
Esencia (2021)

Alejandra Feliz
Ahora Es Que Falta (2019)

Singles
These singles are from songs not included in an album or singles from other artists.

As A Duo
As Lead Artists
2006: "Doña Rosa"
2011: "Its Okay"
2012: "Melodia De Amor" (feat. Lenny Santos)
2012: "Karma"
2012: "En Sueños"
2013: "Mirame"
2013: "Como Quisiera"
2013: "Se Robo"
2014: "Tu Dolor De Cabeza"
2015: "Que Falto"
2016: "Quiero Ser"

Featurings
2009: "El Culpable Soy Yo (Bachata Version)" (with Cristian Castro)
2009: "Devuélveme La Navidad" (with Xtreme)

Solo Singles
Circharles
As Lead Singer
2017: "Besos Toxicos"
2018: "Tu Judini"
2018: "El Destrono"
2018: "Mi Venganza"
2019: "Que Me Escuchen"
2019: "Como Yo Hago"
2019: "Fue Mi Error"
2019: "Una Extraña Mas"
2019: "Vistete De Blanco"
2020: "Limpia Tus Lágrimas"
2020: "El Arte De Amar"
2021: "Arrepentida" (featuring Santana)
2022: "La Historia"
2022: "Fatal"

Featurings
2016: "El Día (Que Te Lleve El Diablo)" (with Exceder)
2018: "Era Mentira" (with Bachata Heightz)
2020: "Amigo" (with Brandon)

Alejandra Feliz
As Lead Singer
2017: "Fuiste Tú" (feat. Jeyro)
2017: "Pierdes Tu"
2019: "Animales" (From SP Polanco's Compilation Album Bchta Rising)
2021: "No Me Pregunten Por El"

Featurings
2017: "Nunca Me Fui" (with Dennis Fernando) - Sound Track for Sin Senos Sí Hay Paraíso (With Out Brest, There Is A Paradise) Season 2
2019: "Creeme" (with Ricky G)

References

American bachata musicians
American people of Dominican Republic descent
Machete Music artists
Bachata music groups